Events from the year 1607 in France

Incumbents
 Monarch – Henry IV

Events

Pont Neuf inaugurated in Paris
The rule of Andorra passes jointly to the king of France and the Bishop of Urgell
20 December – "Great Winter", 3 months of harsh weather, begins

Births
10 January – Isaac Jogues, Jesuit priest and missionary (died 1646)
24 June – Jean-Jacques Renouard de Villayer, member of the Conseil d'État (died 1691)
10 July – Philippe Labbe, Jesuit writer (died 1667)
12 July – Jean Petitot, painter (died 1691).
between 31 October and 6 December – Pierre de Fermat, mathematician (died 1665)
15 November – Madeleine de Scudéry, writer (died 1701)
Full date missing – Étienne de Flacourt, governor of Madagascar (died 1660)

Deaths
15 April – César de Bus, priest (born 1544)
17 May 17 – Anna d'Este, princess (born 1531)
5 September – Pomponne de Bellièvre, politician (born 1529)
7 or 9 September – Pomponne de Bellièvre, statesman (born 1529)

See also

References

1600s in France